Abigail Jane Kathryn Tarttelin (born 13 October 1987) is an English novelist and actress. Her second book, Golden Boy, was described as a "dazzling debut" by Oprah's Book Club. Published in 2013, the book was translated into several languages and on the Evening Standard's 2013 "25 people under 25" list. She is a 2014 recipient of the Alex Awards.

Early life
Tarttelin was born in Grimsby, Humberside (now North East Lincolnshire). Her paternal grandfather is artist David Tarttelin. At the age of 16, she trained with the National Youth Theatre and the New York Film Academy school in France, acting in over 20 short films. One, La Geode by New York artist Theresa Hong appeared in the Official Selection of the New York Short Film Festival, the LA Shorts Fest, and Strasbourg Film Festival.

Career

Film and television
Her first acting role was Fenella in The Butterfly Tattoo. The following year she was the lead in independent sci-fi Schrödinger's Girl (now titled Triple Hit) playing three versions of the same woman in parallel worlds. The film premiered in 2009 at the San Diego Comic-Con International. She attended Comic-Con and Cannes Film Festival with The Butterfly Tattoo and Triple Hit, and in 2009 was one of two actresses listed in Moviescope magazine's "ones to watch" selection of British artists working in independent film. She also appeared in the film Three Stags, directed by Mark Locke, and bilingual thriller Taxi Rider in 2010. In addition her involvement with Equity (trade union) saw her elected as Chairperson for the inaugural Young Members' Committee.

She has directed trailers for Flick and Golden Boy, the music video for Michael Reeve's cover of Flume by Bon Iver, and in 2016 a television pilot called The Danelaw.

In 2016 she was a judge for the 2016 BIFA's (British Independent Film Awards).

Writing

Tarttelin's debut novel, Flick, was first published by Beautiful Books in April 2011, then republished in 2015 by W&N. The story follows a disaffected teenage boy named Flick in a small factory town in northern England, where "bleak and sometimes treacherous circumstances make the taste of a love affair even sweeter." It was hailed "a slow-burn cult classic" by GQ who found it "both authentic and compelling"

In 2013, she published her second novel Golden Boy, about an intersex teenager. It has since been published in Chinese, Spanish and Portuguese. It won a 2014 Alex Awards from the American Library Association, was one of School Library Journal's best books of 2013, and was shortlisted for the 2014 LAMBDA Award for Best Debut LGBT Fiction. The book has been well received by readers and the film rights are also in discussion.

Her third novel, Dead Girls, was published in 2018. It is set in a small English village and is narrated in first person by eleven-year-old Thera Wilde, who takes matters into her own hands following the sudden disappearance of her best friend.

In addition to her three novels Tarttelin was a screenwriter for Academy Award short film shortlist filmmaker Chris Jones. as well as writing the screenplay for the television pilot of The Danelaw. She has also written for the blog Women & Hollywood and founded and edits the publication I Hope You Like Feminist Rants.

Bibliography 
 Flick, London, April 2011. 
 Golden Boy, London, W&N, 9 May 2013.

References

External links 
 
 
 
 "Low pay/no pay week: Karina Cornell", The Stage 4 July 2011. Retrieved 20 July 2011

1987 births
Living people
English women novelists
21st-century English novelists
English film actresses
New York Film Academy alumni
National Youth Theatre members
People from Grimsby
People educated at Queen Elizabeth's Grammar School, Horncastle
21st-century English women writers
21st-century English actresses